The 1957–58 Chicago Black Hawks season was the team's 32nd season in the NHL, and the club was coming off their fourth consecutive last place finish in the league in 1956–57, as they had a 16–39–15 record, earning 47 points.  The struggling Black Hawks had finished in last nine times in the past eleven seasons, and only one playoff appearance since 1946.

During the off-season, the Black Hawks and Detroit Red Wings made a blockbuster trade, as Chicago traded Hank Bassen, Johnny Wilson, Bill Preston, and Forbes Kennedy to the Red Wings for Glenn Hall and Ted Lindsay.  Hall had won the Calder Memorial Trophy in 1956, while Lindsay was a key member of the Red Wings Stanley Cup championships in 1950, 1952, 1954, and 1955.  Chicago also signed 18-year-old Bobby Hull, who had spent the past two seasons with the St. Catharines Teepees of the OHA.

Chicago got off to a good start, playing over .500 hockey thirteen games into the season, as they had a 6–5–3 record, however, the club fell into a slump, going 4–12–3 in their next 19 games, falling out of the playoff race.  Tommy Ivan decided to step down from head coaching duties, as he hired former Teepees head coach Rudy Pilous to take over the team.  The Hawks responded, playing .500 hockey in Pilous' first 18 games behind the bench to get back into the playoff race, however, a seven-game losing streak soon followed, and the team fell out of playoff contention for good.  The Hawks finished the year 24–39–7, earning 55 points, their highest total since 1952–53, and did not finish in last place for the first time since 1953, as they had two more points than the Toronto Maple Leafs.

Offensively, Chicago was led by Ed Litzenberger, who led the club in goals with 32, while adding 30 assists for 62 points.  Rookie Bobby Hull scored 13 goals and 47 points, as he finishing second to Frank Mahovlich of the Toronto Maple Leafs for the Calder Memorial Trophy.  Ted Lindsay recorded 15 goals and 39 points in his first season with the team, which was a 46-point dropoff from the previous season.  Lindsay also had a club high 110 penalty minutes.  Pierre Pilote led the defense, scoring 6 goals and 30 points, while fellow blueliner Moose Vasko scored 6 goals and 26 points.

In goal, Glenn Hall had all the playing time, winning 24 games, while posting a 2.86 GAA, and earning 7 shutouts.

Season standings

Record vs. opponents

Game log

Regular season

Season stats

Scoring leaders

Goaltending

References

External links
 1957–58 Chicago Black Hawks at Hockey-Reference.com

Chicago Blackhawks seasons
Chicago
Chicago